

The Alps are one of the great mountain range systems of Europe stretching approximately 1,200 kilometres (750 mi) across eight Alpine countries from Austria and Slovenia in the east, Switzerland, Liechtenstein, Germany, France to the west and Italy and Monaco to the south.
The flora of the Alps are diverse. In the mountains, the vegetation gradually changes with altitude, sun exposure, and location on the mountain. There are five successive life zones, each with distinct landscapes and vegetation characteristics: premontane, montane, subalpine, alpine, and alvar.

List of Alpine plants

A

Achillea atrata
Aconitum lycoctonum
Aconitum napellus
Adenostyles alliariae
Adenostyles leucophylla
Agrimonia eupatoria
Alchemilla alpina
Allium insubricum
Androsace alpina
Androsace brevis
Androsace carnea
Anemone vernalis
Antennaria dioica
Aquilegia alpina
Arctostaphylos alpinus
Arenaria pseudofrigida
Armeria alpina
Arnica montana
Artemisia mutellina
Asphodelus albus
Aster alpinus
Astrantia major

C

Caltha palustris
Campanula barbata
Campanula persicifolia
Campanula thyrsoides
Campanula zoysii
Carlina acanthifolia
Carlina acaulis
Carlina vulgaris
Carex curvula
Centaurea jacea
Centaurea montana
Centaurea phrygia
Centaurea scabiosa
Chamerion angustifolium
Chenopodium bonus-henricus
Cicerbita alpina
Cicerbita plumieri
Cirsium spinosissimum
Clematis alpina
Crocus vernus
Cyclamen europaeum
Cypripedium calceolus

D

Dactylorhiza fuchsii
Dactylorhiza maculata
Daphne cneorum
Dianthus monspessulanus
Dianthus pavonius
Digitalis grandiflora
Digitalis lutea
Digitalis purpurea
Doronicum grandiflorum
Dryas octopetala

E
Erinus alpinus
Eriophorum angustifolium
Eritrichium nanum
Eryngium alpinum

G

{
Geranium silvaticum
Geum montanum
'

H
Heracleum sphondylium
Hieracium alpinum
Hieracium pilosella
Hieracum intybaceum

I
Inula montana
Iris pseudacorus

L

Leontopodium alpinum
Leucanthemopsis alpina
Lilium bulbiferum
Lilium martagon
Linaria alpina
Loiseleurie couchée

M
Melampyrum arvense
Melampyrum nemorosum
Melampyrum pratense
Micranthes stellaris, syn. Saxifraga stellaris

N
Nigritella rhellicani

O

Ophrys fuciflora
Opuntia

P

Papaver hi
Papaver rhaeticum
Phyteuma hemisphaericum
Phyteuma spicatum
Pinguicula alpina
Pinguicula grandiflora
Pinguicula vulgaris

R

Ranunculus glacialis
Ranunculus pyrenaeus
Rhododendron ferrugineum
Rosa pendulina
Rumex crispus
Rumex nivalis

S

Saxifraga oppositifolia
Saxifraga paniculata
Scabiosa columbaria
Scabiosa lucida
Scilla bifolia
Sempervivum archnoideum
Sempervivum montanum
Senecio doronicum
Senecio fuchsii
Senecio leucophyllus
Silene acaulis
Silene rupestris
Silene vulgaris
Soldanella alpina
Stipa pennata

T
Trifolium alpinum
Trollius europaeus

V
Veratrum album

References

External links

Michael Hassler, University of Karlsruhe.

 
Alps
Alps
.Alps
Alps
Alps
Alps
Alps